Afton Township is a township in Brookings County, South Dakota, United States. The population was 224 in the 2000 census.

References

External links
Detailed profile, city-data.com

Townships in Brookings County, South Dakota
Townships in South Dakota